Beverly Hills is an upscale neighbourhood in Kingston, Jamaica.
The association can be contacted at: 

Neighbourhoods in Kingston, Jamaica